The genus Parnassia, also known as grass of Parnassus or bog-stars, are plants now placed in the family Celastraceae, formerly classified in Parnassiaceae or Saxifragaceae. The plants occur in arctic and alpine habitats, as well as in dune systems and fens, swamps, wet meadows, open seepage areas, moist woods, and across the Northern Hemisphere. It is actually not a grass, but an herbaceous dicot. The flower has five white petals with light green venation. There are five three-pronged sterile stamens, each tipped with drop-like false nectaries, which (along with the visual cue of veins) attract pollinating flies and bees.

Some species are often found in wet calcareous habitats with low fertility, low canopy cover, and high plant diversity. Parnassia glauca is considered to be an indicator species of fens in New York State.  Such habitats are often becoming rare, and so species of Parnassia may have high conservation value.  For example Parnassia palustris is threatened and legally protected in Michigan while Parnassia caroliniana is considered imperiled in North Carolina.

Parnassus flowers are the symbol of the Clan MacLea, also known as the highland Livingstone clan, and said to be the favorite flower of St. Moluag, the Irish missionary whose staff the clan chiefs hold.  Three Grass of Parnassus flowers appear on the Flag of Cumberland, a British county, since that flower grows on Cumberland's lofty fells.

Species include:
 Parnassia asarifolia
 Parnassia cabulica
 Parnassia caroliniana
 Parnassia californica
 Parnassia cirrata
 Parnassia fimbriata
 Parnassia foliosa
 Parnassia glauca
 Parnassia grandifolia
 Parnassia kotzebuei
 Parnassia palustris
 Parnassia parviflora

References

External links
Parnassia entry at USDA PLANTS database

 
Celastrales genera